Susan Shortt (born 25 February 1966) is an Irish equestrian. She competed at the 2000 Summer Olympics and the 2004 Summer Olympics.

References

External links
 

1966 births
Living people
Irish female equestrians
Olympic equestrians of Ireland
Equestrians at the 2000 Summer Olympics
Equestrians at the 2004 Summer Olympics
People from Kilkenny (city)